Oliver Charles Hughes (born 27 June 1970; Folkestone, UK) is a British entrepreneur and financier. He graduated from the University of Sussex in 1992. He headed Tinkoff Bank from 2007 to 2021. In 2021, he left the post of chairman of the board and became a co-CEO of TCS Group. In March 2022, he stepped down from the Board of Directors of TCS Group and relocated to reside full-time in UAE. In April 2022, he quit the position of a co-CEO of TCS Group to launch a fintech startup Kinetic Finance.

References

British financiers
1970 births
Living people
Alumni of the University of Sussex